The 2007 Asian Tour was the 13th season of the modern Asian Tour, the main men's professional golf tour in Asia excluding Japan, since it was established in 1995. Prize money for the season exceeded US$27 million and Liang Wenchong became the first golfer from mainland China to top the Order of Merit.

Schedule
The following table lists official events during the 2007 season.

Order of Merit
The Order of Merit was titled as the UBS Order of Merit and was based on prize money won during the season, calculated in U.S. dollars.

Awards

Notes

References

External links
The Asian Tour's official English language site

Asian Tour
Asian Tour